Deon Edwin (born October 9, 1992) is an U.S. Virgin Islander professional basketball player for Paks Atomerőmű of the Hungarian First League at club, and the US Virgin Islands internationally.

Club career
Edwin started his professional career KTP-Basket in the Finnish Korisliiga. He averaged 15.3 points and 6.0 rebounds in 41 games during his rookie season.

In August 2018, Edwin signed with Ukrainian club Khimik of the Ukrainian Basketball SuperLeague. He was an instrumental part in Khimik's run to the 2018–19 Ukrainian SuperLeague title. He averaged 15.8 points per game for Khimik.

On July 29, 2019, Edwin signed with Kyiv-Basket in Ukraine.

For the 2020–21 season, Edwin signed with his third Ukrainian team, Prometey, and won a second Ukrainian Basketball SuperLeague title. Edwin averaged 11.3 points, 6.3 rebounds and 4.3 assists for Prometey.

Edwin rejoined Khimik in 2021 and averaged 12 points, 4.5 rebounds, and 3.3 assists per game. On February 11, 2022, he signed with Rabotnički of the Macedonian League.

National team career
Edwin has been a member of the U.S. Virgin Islands national basketball team and played with the team at 2017 FIBA AmeriCup. He averaged 6.6 points and 4.4 rebounds in five games, helping his country end in the fourth place.

References

1992 births
Living people
American expatriate basketball people in Ukraine
American men's basketball players
BC Khimik players
BC Prometey players
Kent State Golden Flashes men's basketball players
KTP-Basket players
Kyiv-Basket players
United States Virgin Islands men's basketball players